John Heriot's Wife is a 1920 Dutch-British silent crime film directed by Maurits Binger.

Cast
 Mary Odette - Camilla Rivers
 Lola Cornero - Tante Lady Foxborough
 Henry Victor - John Heriot
 Annie Bos - Weduwe Clara Headcombe (as Anna Bosilova)
 Adelqui Migliar - Eric Ashlyn
 Renee Spiljar
 Carl Tobi
 Alex Benno
 Reginald Lawson
 Leni Marcus
 Fred Homann

External links 
 

1920 films
British silent feature films
Dutch silent feature films
British black-and-white films
Dutch black-and-white films
1920 crime films
Films directed by Maurits Binger
British crime films
Dutch crime films
1920s British films
Silent crime films